The House of the Dead  is an 1932 Russian film directed by Vasili Fyodorov from a script by Viktor Shklovsky, based on the novel of the same name by Fyodor Dostoevsky. Shklovsky changed the name of the script several times, eventually calling it The House of the Dead (Mertvyi dom). The film stars Nikolay Khmelyov, Nikolay Podgorny, Nikolai Vitovtov and Mikhail Zharov.

Cast 
 Nikolay Khmelyov as Fyodor Dostoyevsky
 Nikolai Podgorny as K.P. Pobedonstzev
 Nikolai Vitovtov as Tsar Nikolai I
 Nikolai Radin as L.V. Doubelt
 Vladimir Belokurov as Stammering Announcer
 Vladimir Uralsky
 Vasili Kovrigin as Uspensky
 Gleb Kuznetsov as Guards soldier
 Viktor Shklovsky as Petrashevsky
 Georgiy Sochevko as Yastrzhembskiy

Release
The film was banned in Spain in 1935, but acquired by the British National Film Centre and the British Film Museum for showing in the Dostoyevsky jubilee in 1972.

References

External links

 The House of the Dead at the kino-teatr.ru

1932 films
Soviet drama films
1932 drama films
Soviet black-and-white films
1930s Russian-language films